is the 25th major single by the Japanese female idol group Cute. It was released in Japan on July 16, 2014.

Background 
The CD single will be released in six versions: Limited Editions A, B, C, D and Regular Editions A, B. Both regular editions are CD-only. All the limited editions come with a DVD containing music videos, etc. and include a serial-numbered entry card for the lottery to win a ticket to one of the single's launch events. Both regular editions include a photocard.

Track listing

Limited Editions A, C and Regular Edition A

Limited Editions B, D and Regular Edition B

Bonus 
 Sealed into all the limited editions:
 Event ticket lottery card with a serial number
 Sealed into the first press of all the regular editions:
 Photocard, random out of several  types (Regular Edition A: 1 group photo and 5 solo member photos in the costumes for "The Power", Regular Edition B: 1 group photo and 5 solo member photos in the costumes for "Kanashiki Heaven (Single Version)")

Charts

References

External links 
 Profile on the Hello! Project official website
 Profile on the Up-Front Works official website
 Profile on Tsunku's official website

2014 singles
Japanese-language songs
Cute (Japanese idol group) songs
Songs written by Tsunku
Song recordings produced by Tsunku
Zetima Records singles
2014 songs